Moses Rager (April 2, 1911 – May 14, 1986) was a guitar player from Kentucky.  He is credited with creating the thumb-picking style of guitar playing - which he taught to Merle Travis.

Laverda Rager was the daughter of Mose Rager. She was interviewed by musicologist Erika Brady in 2000.

References

External links
 Darrel McClellan's Mose Rager Page

1911 births
1986 deaths
Guitarists from Kentucky
20th-century American guitarists